Cobble Court is a historic house originally commissioned by the distiller J. Hazeltine Carstairs, who owned 50 acres from Marple Rd. to Ardmore Ave. Originally named Spring Hill Farms, the house was built alongside the first hole of the Merion Golf Club west course in 1924. Sold to Henry Bryer, the owner of Bryers, a prominent  ice cream manufacturer, who installed the cobblestone courtyard, and changed the name to "Cobble Court." In 1963 the Breyers estate was subdivided and the main house sold to Stuart Saunders of the Pennsylvania Railroad.
After Carstairs, the home was purchased by Marian and Marvin Garfinkel.

The house is on the local survey of historic buildings. The home was designed by John Russell Pope, an architect who is also credited with designing the Jefferson Memorial and the National Gallery of Art.

See also
National Register of Historic Places listings in Delaware County, Pennsylvania

References

External links
 http://haverford.pastperfectonline.com/photo/5458E69D-521D-460F-A46A-783869406439
 Pennsylvania Historic Resource Survey Form, see p. 7
 Historic Resources Survey, Haverford Township, Delaware County, PA. Delaware County Planning Commission, 1994.

National Register of Historic Places in Delaware County, Pennsylvania
Houses on the National Register of Historic Places in Pennsylvania
Houses in Delaware County, Pennsylvania
National Historic Landmarks in Pennsylvania